Cobubatha dividua is a species of moth in the family Noctuidae (the owlet moths). It is found in North America.

The MONA or Hodges number for Cobubatha dividua is 9018.

References

Further reading

 

Eustrotiinae